Chaurasi Khambon ki Chhatri or "84-Pillared Cenotaph" is a chhatri located in Bundi town, Rajasthan, India. It was constructed in 1683 by the Maharaja of Bundi, Rao Raja Anirudh, as a memorial to his foster brother, Deva.

The structure has a large shivling covered by a decorated roof top that is supported by 84 pillars; tradition has it that one is unable to reach 84 correctly when counting them.

External links 

 Chaurasi Khambon ki Chhatri

Tourist attractions in Bundi district
Monuments and memorials in Rajasthan
Buildings and structures completed in 1740
Cenotaphs in India
Bundi